Methuselah's Lamp, or The Last Battle of the Chekists and Masons is a novel by Victor Pelevin first published in 2016.

The main characters are generations of the Mozhaisky family. The narrative begins in the 19th century and ends in our time. The author in ironic form tries to explain the difficult international situation of Russia through the problems of Freemasonry.

Plot

The novel is made up of four parts. The first, "The Production Narrative" is the memoirs of the trader Krimpai Mozhaysky, relating to our, well, very recent times. The second, "Space Drama" is a long letter from his great-great-grandfather, Markian Mozhaysky, to his bride, written in the 1880s. The third – "Historical Essay" – tells about a mysterious unit in the Gulag, where the great-grandfather was sitting Krimpai Methuselah that existed from the 20s to the 60s of 20th century. The fourth – "Operational Etude" – tells about the out-of-body experience of an FSB general in our days.

All these parts complement each other, penetrate into each other, explain each other – and as a result not completely clear, but a vivid picture is built, according to which the confrontation between Russia and the West is explained by the clash of the higher forces ruling the world through the Masonic groupings. In today's Russia, the center of Freemasonry is the FSB, in America, the point of Masonic power is located in the basement of the Federal Reserve building.

The first part is the story of a trader with the pornographic name of Krimpai (towards the end he changes it to the patriotic "Crimea"), a gay and professional double-crosser who alternately writes analytical reviews for both "liberals" and "Russian conservatives". 

The largest part of the novel, the second part, an essay about attempts to change the history of aeronautics to reverse the lag between Russia and the West, is mildly stylized as classical Russian literature. From it we learn about the eternal confrontation between two beginnings – Civilization and Vatha, Freemasons and Chekists or two powerful alien races – the Reptiloids and the Beards (the former oversee America, the latter patronize Russia). 

The third part, built on the archetypes of twentieth-century camp prose, tells of a special "Templeag" on Novaya Zemlya, where, during the Stalin era, repressed Freemasons in eerie conditions erect the Temple of Solomon – in fact, a powerful portal, making possible the appearance of the deity in our world. 

The fourth episode, "Kapustin's Feat" (the most auteuristic of all), elegantly closes the circle, taking the eternal "Great Game" to a new turn – and at the same time explaining why the first part was such a failure and looked like a self-parody.

Methuselah's Lamp has many entertaining, intuitively compelling observations. For example, if Pelevin is to be believed, Russia has a great past and a great future, but its present fails. And mainly because the bearded race, the space curators of our country, have been banished from the present by the reptiloid competitors and live exclusively in the past and the future.

The metaphorically derived Western and Russian worlds, named as Civilization and Vata, united through the love of the dollar, no longer secured by anything, neither gold nor faith. Chekist and Freemason in embrace continue to walk the transition, which comes from nowhere and is sure to lead to nowhere.

References

Novels by Victor Pelevin
2016 novels
21st-century Russian novels